Kim Man-sig (30 December 1940 – 18 January 2013) was a South Korean fencer. He competed in the individual and team foil and épée events at the 1964 Summer Olympics.

References

External links
 

1940 births
2013 deaths
South Korean male foil fencers
South Korean male épée fencers
Olympic fencers of South Korea
Fencers at the 1964 Summer Olympics
Kyung Hee University alumni
Fencers from Seoul
Sportspeople from Ulsan